Siegmund (Sigismund) Freiherr von Herberstein (or Baron Sigismund von Herberstein; 23 August 1486 – 28 March 1566) was a Carniolan diplomat, writer, historian and member of the Holy Roman Empire Imperial Council. He was most noted for his extensive writing on the geography, history and customs of Russia, and contributed greatly to early Western European knowledge of that area.

Early life
Herberstein was born in 1486 in Vipava in the Duchy of Carniola, now in Slovenia, then part of the Habsburg monarchy. His parents were Leonhard von Herberstein and Barbara von Lueg, members of the prominent German-speaking family which had already resided in Herberstein Castle for nearly 200 years. Little is known of his early life apart from the fact that he became familiar with the Slovene language spoken in the region. This knowledge became significant later in his life.

In 1499, he entered the University of Vienna to study philosophy and law. In 1506, he entered the army as an officer and served in a number of campaigns. In 1508, he was knighted by the Holy Roman Emperor, Maximilian I, in person. In 1515, he entered the Imperial council, or Parliament, and began a long and illustrious diplomatic career.

Diplomatic career
Between 1515 and 1553, Herberstein carried out approximately 69 missions abroad, travelling throughout much of Europe, including Turkey. He was feted by the ruling Habsburgs and rewarded with titles and estates. These extended visits (nine months in his 1517 visit) provided him with the opportunity to study a hitherto largely unknown Russian society.

Writing on Eastern Europe

Herberstein's knowledge of Slovene, acquired in his youth, allowed him to communicate freely with Rusins and Moskovits, as Slovene and Russian both belong to the Slavic languages. He used this ability to question a variety of people in Moskovia and Nowgorod as well as Kyiv on a wide range of topics. This gave him an insight into Moskovia and Moskovits unavailable to the few previous visitors to this region. 

He probably wrote his first account of life in Moskovia between 1517 and 1527, but no copy of this survives. In 1526, he was asked to produce a formal report on his experiences in Moskovia, but this remained relatively unnoticed in the archives until he was able to find time to revise and expand it, which he possibly started in the 1530s.

The evidence suggests that Herberstein was an energetic and capable ethnographer. He investigated in depth both by questioning locals and by critically examining the scarce existing literature on Moskovia. The result was his major work, a book written in Latin titled Rerum Moscoviticarum Commentarii (literally Notes on Muscovite Affairs), published in 1549. This became the main early source of knowledge in Western Europe on Moskovia.

In 1546 he made the first known map showing Western Europe territory, including Nowgorodia, Moskovia, Twer and Volodimeria as well as some Ukrainian cities and countries Moldavia, Lithuania and Livonia. 

«Moscovia Sigismundi liberi Baronis in Herberstein, Neiperg, et Gutenhag anno M. D. XLV» 

He was the first to record the spelling of tsar as czar (both spellings are meant to express the same pronunciation). Later, English and French began to move from the 'cz' spelling to the 'ts' spelling in the 19th century.

References
The primary source of material on Herberstein is Marshall Poe's publications, particularly 'A People Born To Slavery': Russia in Early Modern European Ethnography (Cornell UP).

Footnotes

External links

Notes upon Russia, the English translation of Herberstein's book by Richard Henry Major, with a long preface; vol. 1
Russian text of Herberstein's book

1486 births
1566 deaths
Carniolan nobility
Carniolan diplomats
People of the Grand Duchy of Moscow
People from Vipava, Vipava
Carniolan people of German descent
Writers about Russia